The Cumbria Shield is an annual rugby union knock-out club competition organized by the Cumbria Rugby Union.  It was introduced during the 1888-89 season, when it was known as the Cumberland Challenge Shield, and the inaugural winners were Millom.  Initially it was open only to junior club sides in Cumberland (senior sides played in the Challenge Cup) but in 1974, as a result of the 1972 Local Government Act, Cumberland, Westmorland and Furness merged to form what we now know as Cumbria, and the competition would ultimately be renamed as the Cumbria Shield.  It is the third most important cup competition in Cumbria, behind the Cumbria Cup and Cumbria League Cup.

Originally the Shield was a knock-out cup played by the 1st teams of junior clubs, along with the 2nd teams of senior clubs, before becoming mostly a 2nd team competition.  In later years the format switched back and forth between a knock-out cup and league cup-hybrid, but has most recently switched to being awarded to the winners of the Cumbria Shield League - a regional league for 2nd and 3rd teams in Cumbria.  A secondary competition known as the Cumbria Vase was introduced in 2007 initially for sides knocked out of the early rounds of the Shield competition, although in recent years it seems to have become a stand-alone cup competition for 2nd teams in the region.

Cumbria Shield winners

Cumbria Vase winners

Number of wins

Shield
Workington II (19)
Aspatria II (16)
Wigton II (10)
Netherhall II (9)
St Benedict's (9)
Millom (6)
Silloth (6)
Cockermouth II (5)
Egremont II (5)
Penrith (5)
Whitehaven II (4)
Moresby (3)
Blennerhasset II (1)
Border Regiment (1)
Carlisle 'A' (1)
Clifton (1)
Cumberland & Westmorland Police (1)
High Moor Rovers Dearham (1)
Kendal II (1)
Kirkby Lonsdale II (1)
Maryport II (1)
United Steels S.O (1)
Wath Brow (1)
Whitehaven Recreation (1)
Wigton Hornets (1)
Workington Trades (1)

Vase 
Kendal 'A' (3)
Carlisle 'A' (2)
Creighton (1)
Penrith III (1)

Notes

See also
 Cumbria Rugby Union
 Cumbria Cup
 Cumbria League Cup
 Westmorland & Furness Cup

References

External links
 Cumbria RU

Recurring sporting events established in 1888
1888 establishments in England
Rugby union cup competitions in England
Rugby union in Cumbria